Lake Canllacocha (possibly from Quechua kanlla, kanlli pearlfruit (Margyricarpus pinnatus), qucha lake) is a lake in Peru located in the Huancavelica Region, Huancavelica Province, Acobambilla District. Canllacocha lies east of the larger Lake Huarmicocha and south of Lake Acchicocha of the Junín Region.

See also
List of lakes in Peru

References

Lakes of Peru
Lakes of Huancavelica Region